Jean Raymond Henri Thorailler (7 January 1888 – 26 January 1957) was a French male water polo player. He was a member of the France men's national water polo team. He competed with the team at the 1912 Summer Olympics and 1920 Summer Olympics. Thorailler was given the honour to carry the national flag of France during the opening ceremony of the 1928 Summer Olympics in Amsterdam, becoming the fourth water polo player to be a flag bearer at the opening and closing ceremonies of the Olympics.

See also
 France men's Olympic water polo team records and statistics
 List of men's Olympic water polo tournament goalkeepers

References

External links
 

1888 births
1957 deaths
French male water polo players
Water polo goalkeepers
Water polo players at the 1920 Summer Olympics
Water polo players at the 1912 Summer Olympics
Olympic water polo players of France
People from Épernay
Sportspeople from Marne (department)